John Ray Simon, Jr. (born December 11, 1978) is a former American football running back in the National Football League for the Tennessee Titans and the Washington Redskins.  He played college football at Louisiana Tech University, where he gained 4,852 all-purpose yards and started all four years. 

As of 2022, he serves as the offensive coordinator at  Grambling State University.

References

1978 births
Living people
Players of American football from Baton Rouge, Louisiana
American football running backs
Louisiana Tech Bulldogs football players
Tennessee Titans players
Washington Redskins players